Ian Flynn (born May 31, 1982), also known by his Internet pen name Ian Potto, is an American comic book writer. He was chief writer for Archie Comics's Sonic the Hedgehog since issue #160, after the departure of the previous chief writer Ken Penders, till Archie's cancelation on the run at issue #290. As of April 4, 2018, he is the lead writer of IDW Publishing's Sonic the Hedgehog comic series and Sonic Frontiers. He is also known for Archie's Mega Man, New Crusaders, Archie (2015), as well as IDW's Teenage Mutant Ninja Turtles.

Career
Flynn was hired as a writer on Archie's Sonic the Hedgehog after sending in unsolicited proposals. He subsequently wrote Sonic Universe; the Capcom series, Mega Man; and New Crusaders, a superhero title published by the Archie Imprint Red Circle Comics. In the Sonic the Hedgehog series, he collaborated with Tracy Yardley, the penciller for the series since issue #160. Flynn made his television writing debut with the Sonic Boom episode "Anything You Can Do I Can Do Worse-er". In December 2021 he was reported to have been writing the script for Sonic Frontiers; he also wrote the scripts for the prologue comic and animation released in the lead-up to Frontiers' release. Flynn also wrote the story scenes for the Sonic Origins compilation. Flynn is also a host on a Q&A podcast, known as the Bumblekast, where he answers questions from fans concerning the Sonic franchise and his work on the series.

Although Sega canceled their Sonic the Hedgehog comic series, Archie Comics brought back Flynn, alongside collaborating colleagues Tracy Yardley and Matt Herms, to revive their Cosmo the Merry Martian intellectual property. The first issue of Cosmo was released in January 2018.

Personal life
Flynn is married to Aleah Baker, who has worked as a writer and colorist on Archie books such as Sonic the Hedgehog and Sonic Universe.

References

External links

BumbleKing Comics & Creative Solutions

1982 births
Living people
Sonic the Hedgehog
American comics writers